Elektroepyris is an extinct genus of wasp within the family Bethylidae containing a single species, Elektroepyris magnificus. It lived in the lower Eocene, with the type locality being from the Oise amber, Le Quesnoy located in France.

References 

Fossil taxa described in 2008
Prehistoric insects of Europe
Prehistoric insect genera
Bethylidae
Eocene first appearances
Eocene extinctions
Insects described in 2008